Strawberry Mountain is the highest peak in the Strawberry Mountains of eastern Oregon in the United States. It is the 30th highest point in Oregon. It is in the Malheur National Forest and is the most prominent feature of the Strawberry Mountain Wilderness.

History
The mountain, and nearby Strawberry Creek, were named by homesteader Nathan Willis Fisk "because there were wild strawberries in abundance there..."  It was originally named "Strawberry Butte", but common usage changed it to Strawberry Mountain, which now appears on official maps.

References

External links

 
 
Mountains of Oregon
Landmarks in Oregon
Landforms of Grant County, Oregon
Malheur National Forest